Jovanii Nez, known as Jaynez is an American, urban R&B singer who and has won awards at the New Mexico Music Awards, and the "Best Debut Artist of the Year" at the 7th Annual Native American Music Awards. Jaynez has also been nominated in the 9th Annual Native American Music Awards.

References

American rhythm and blues musicians
Year of birth missing (living people)
Living people